Henry Horatio Dixon FRS (19 May 1869, Dublin – 20 December 1953, Dublin) was a plant biologist and professor at Trinity College Dublin. Along with John Joly, he put forward the cohesion-tension theory of water and mineral movement in plants.

He was born in Dublin, the youngest of the seven sons of George Dixon, a soap manufacturer and Rebecca (née Yeates) Dixon. He was educated at Rathmines School and Trinity College, Dublin. After studying in Bonn, Germany he in 1894 he was appointed assistant and later full Professor of Botany at Trinity. In 1906 he became Director of the Botanic gardens and in 1910 of the Herbarium also. He had a close working relationship with physicist John Joly and together they developed the cohesion theory of the ascent of sap.

In 1907 he married Dorothea Mary, daughter of  Sir John H Franks, with whom he raised three sons. He was the father of Hal Dixon and grandfather of Adrian Dixon, Joly Dixon and Ruth Dixon.

In 1908 he was elected a Fellow of the Royal Society, his application citation describing him as

He delivered the society's Croonian Lecture in 1937.

In 1916 he was awarded the Boyle Medal of the Royal Dublin Society In 1949 he was elected an honorary fellow of Trinity College Dublin.

References

External links
 

1869 births
1953 deaths
Academics of Trinity College Dublin
Alumni of Trinity College Dublin
Fellows of the Royal Society
Honorary Fellows of Trinity College Dublin
Irish biologists
People educated at Rathmines School